Tri-City Airport  is a privately owned, public use airport located one nautical mile (2 km) southeast of the central business district of Sebring, a village in Mahoning County, Ohio, United States.

Facilities and aircraft 
Tri-City Airport covers an area of 45 acres (18 ha) at an elevation of 1,188 feet (362 m) above mean sea level. It has one runway designated 17/35 with an asphalt surface measuring 2,768 by 45 feet (844 x 14 m).

For the 12-month period ending August 29, 2011, the airport had 10,555 aircraft operations, an average of 28 per day: 99.5% general aviation, 0.3% air taxi, and 0.2% military. At that time there were 28 aircraft based at this airport: 96% single-engine and 4% multi-engine.

References

External links 
 Aerial image as of April 1994 from USGS The National Map
 

Airports in Ohio
Buildings and structures in Mahoning County, Ohio